Dolní Dvořiště is a municipality and village in Český Krumlov District in the South Bohemian Region of the Czech Republic. It has about 1,400 inhabitants. It lies on the border with Austria.

Administrative parts
Villages of Budákov, Jenín, Rybník, Rychnov nad Malší, Tichá, Trojany and Všeměřice are administrative parts of Dolní Dvořiště.

History
The first written mention of Dolní Dvořiště is from 1279.

Transport
Dolní Dvořiště is situated at the road I/3, which is one of the most important links between the Czech Republic and Austria. The construction of the D3 motorway is planned, connecting the municipality with Prague and České Budějovice.

Gallery

References

External links

 

Villages in Český Krumlov District
Bohemian Forest